The 2017 Oklahoma State Cowboys football team represented Oklahoma State University in the 2017 NCAA Division I FBS football season. The Cowboys played their home games at the Boone Pickens Stadium in Stillwater, Oklahoma and competed in the Big 12 Conference. They were led by 13th-year head coach Mike Gundy. They finished the season 10–3, 6–3 in Big 12 play to finish in third place. They were invited to the Camping World Bowl where they defeated Virginia Tech.

Schedule
Oklahoma State announced its 2017 football schedule on December 13, 2016. The 2017 schedule consisted of 6 home and 6 away games in the regular season. The Cowboys hosted Big 12 foes Baylor, Kansas, Kansas State, Oklahoma, and TCU, and traveled to Iowa State, Texas, Texas Tech, and West Virginia.

The Cowboys hosted one of the three non-conference opponents, Tulsa from the American Athletic Conference and traveled to Pittsburgh from the Atlantic Coast Conference and South Alabama from the Sun Belt Conference.

Schedule Source: http://www.fbschedules.com/ncaa-17/2017-oklahoma-state-cowboys-football-schedule.php

Game summaries

Tulsa

at South Alabama

at Pittsburgh

TCU

at Texas Tech

Baylor

at Texas

at West Virginia

Oklahoma

at Iowa State

Kansas State

Kansas

Virginia Tech

Rankings

References

Oklahoma State
Oklahoma State Cowboys football seasons
Cheez-It Bowl champion seasons
Oklahoma State Cowboys football